National Institute of Securities Markets (NISM) is an Indian public trust and also the national apex body for the regulation and licensing of financial market dealing profession in India along with being the central civil service staff training institute of SEBI established in 2006 by the Securities and Exchange Board of India (SEBI) the regulator for the securities market in India. It is under the ownership of the Securities and Exchange Board of India, Ministry of Finance, Government of India.

History
In the Budget Speech of February 2006, P Chidambaram, the erstwhile Union Finance Minister, proposed to authorize the Securities and Exchange Board of India to set up a National Institute of Securities Markets for teaching and training intermediaries in securities markets and promoting research. Accordingly, NISM was established in 2006.  NISM seeks to add to market quality through educational initiatives.  It is an autonomous body governed by its Board of Governors. An International Advisory Council provides strategic guidance to NISM.

Structure
The activities of NISM are carried out under six schools. These are as follows:

School for Securities Education (SSE) 
The School for Securities Education (SSE) offers these flagship programmes. The programmes offered under SSE are
 Post-Graduate Diploma in Securities Markets
 LL.M. in Investment and Securities Laws
 Post Graduate Diploma in Portfolio Management, Investment Advisory and Research Analysis
 Post Graduate Certificate in Data Science in Financial Markets
 Post Graduate Certificate in Securities Markets

School for Investor Education and Financial Literacy (SIEFL) 

The School for Investor Education & Financial Literacy (SIEFL) is engaged in propagating the importance of financial literacy among school students through conducting its program-POCKET MONEY. Investor education is dealt at various segments – college students, young investors, retiring population, general public etc. wherein wealth creation through better financial planning is promoted. The School focuses on Securities Market & Mutual Fund awareness through its various trainings and workshops. NISM along with sponsoring corporates (under CSR) is involved as a knowledge and project management partner in a pioneering initiative to empower young citizens of our country for getting employment in the BFSI sector or even starting their own venture in securities markets

School for Certification of Intermediaries (SCI)
The School for Certification of Intermediaries (SCI) is engaged in developing and conducting certification examination for market professionals, aspiring students, investors etc. Most of these certifications developed by NISM are mandated under SEBI (CAPSM) Regulation, 2007 as minimum eligibility criteria to get employed with SEBI registered intermediaries or engaging in rendering licensed advisory services to investors. Additionally, NISM also conduct exams for Pension Fund Regulatory and Development Authority (PFRDA) & Insolvency and Bankruptcy Board of India (IBBI).
These examinations are conducted in the proctored environment throughout the year from 200 plus centres across India.

School for Securities Information and Research (SSIR)

The School for Securities Information and Research (SSIR) has made significant mark in the areas of securities markets research. SSIR aims at motivating and providing an environment to conduct top quality research that contributes immensely to the form and structure of financial markets; helps product innovations and deepening of the markets; evaluates and improves risk management methods and policy research aimed at making the markets a safe place for investors. The School conducts capital market conferences, symposiums, workshops on R, Python and many more.

School for Regulatory Studies and Supervision (SRSS)

The School for Regulatory Studies and Supervision (SRSS) is engaged in developing excellence in regulatory practices among regulators and market participants through training, workshops etc. SRSS conducts capacity building programs, advanced training programs for securities market regulators (domestic and abroad) focusing on policy creation and implementation. SRSS also delivers customised training programs to suit the specific requirements. SRSS utilizes the trading simulation lab to extend an experiential learning to participants wherever required. Industry experts, academic stalwarts and practitioners are invited to deliver the course contents.

School for Corporate Governance (SCG)
The School for Corporate Governance (SCG) conducts various programmes aimed at improving Corporate Governance issues through effective implementation and quality process. With this objective, the School conducts various research and training programmes, which include:

 Familiarization Programme for Directors of Listed Companies
 Roundtable Conference on Corporate Governance and its implications for Board of Directors
 Directors' Colloquium
 Brainstorming Session on Regulatory Issues
 Workshop for Compliance Officers and Company Secretaries
 Research on Environmental, Social and Governance (ESG) issues

Programmes 
The institute is known for its flagship programmes i.e. Post Graduate Diploma in Management (Securities Markets), Post Graduate Program in Portfolio Management / Investment Advisory / Research Analysis, Post Graduate Certificate in Data Science for Financial Markets, Post Graduate Program in Portfolio Management, Investment Advisory and Research Analysis and Post Graduate Certificate in Securities Markets. It also offers certification programmes, academic programmes, training programmes, capacity building and skill development programmes in securities markets and related areas.

The institute also provides financial education and standards to improve financial literacy in the country. The institute is located in Vashi, Navi Mumbai, India. A 72-acre campus at Patalganga (off-Mumbai-Pune Expressway), for the institute, was inaugurated by Narendra Modi, the incumbent prime minister of India, on 24 December 2016. NISM is an autonomous body governed by a Board of Governors. Madhab Puri Buch, the Chairman of SEBI, is the incumbent chairman of NISM. The Institute is divided into six schools that address the different participants of the Indian financial market.

See also

 Securities and Exchange Board of India
 Reserve Bank of India

References

External links
 NISM Official website

Educational organisations based in India
Capital markets of India
Securities and Exchange Board of India
Personal finance education
Professional certification in finance